Mark "Hammer" Dixon is an Australian bodyguard and former boxer.

Early years
Mark James Dixon was born on 19 July 1973 in Brisbane, Australia. Born into a privileged family and educated at Anglican Church Grammar School "Churchie" one of Queensland's most elite private educational facilities, he can hardly be described as a product of his environment in the life that he forged for himself.

Trained as a boxer at an early age by his uncle Alan "Bunger" Johnson who was a boxer of some repute. Australia's first indigenous world boxing champion Lionel Rose was flown to Bunger Johnson's home town to spar with the talented just sixteen year old Bunger. Bunger's influence and training were to play a huge part in the development and mindset of young Mark Dixon, who went from a bullied school boy in his younger years to a boy to be feared and held in great respect for his skill with his fists and controlled aggression.

Taking his talents and sense of wanting to be "a somebody", Mark moved into the often brutal world of nightclub bouncing at the age of seventeen and before too long became one of Brisbane's best known and most feared pub minders.

Becoming the "Hammer"
In 1998 Mark met the notorious underworld figure Mark "Chopper" Read after Chopper was released from Risdon prison in Tasmania, whilst Mark was working as a driver/body guard for Chopper's friend and colleague in crime Charles "Mad Charlie" Hegyalji.

In March 2003 Mark and Chopper Read were to meet again.  Chopper was travelling the country doing paid appearances around Australia and ended up in a venue where the security was run by Mark Dixon. The show and the night ran smoothly until Chopper and his entourage walked into the car park at the evening's end. Lying in wait was a disgruntled patron who ran at Chopper brandishing a claw hammer. With no regard to his own safety, Dixon threw himself in the line of the hammers blow, and after receiving a punishing blow to the chest went on to neutralize the would-be assailant with fists and legs.

This was the day that Mark first became known as "The Hammer" and the day that a union was born between himself and Mark "Chopper" Read. From that day Mark toured the country with Chopper as his personal body guard for a number of years. "THE BEST BODY GUARD GOD EVER SHOVELLED GUTS INTO!" These are the words used by Mark "Chopper" Read when he was asked to describe Mark "Hammer" Dixon.

These Days
These days Mark still works as a body guard when needed, and is still one of Australia's highest paid bouncers. In 2010 Mark was painted by Brisbane Artist, John Sparks. The painting was then used as the cover of a book when Mark penned his memoirs in his book titled "Hammer Bash for Cash"  A real life account of his time as a hard man in the hard world of night club bouncing and his years as body guard to Chopper and his acquaintanceships with other notorious Australian characters such as Roger Rogerson and Roberta Williams.

References

External links 
 Official Homepage of Mark "Hammer" Dixon and Hammer: Bash for Cash by John Sparks.
 Mark on Nova FM Brisbane

1973 births
Bodyguards
Living people
Boxers from Brisbane
Australian male boxers